Bob Christie is a former Scottish continuity announcer.

Christie began his announcing and newsreading career at Scottish Television in the early 1970s before joining BBC Scotland in January 1973 as an announcer for the Radio 4 Scotland opt-out service (replaced in 1978 by BBC Radio Scotland) and BBC Scotland's television opt-outs.

By 1977, Christie along with all other BBC Scotland announcers began to announce all evening and weekend afternoon television programmes.

Until 1988, Christie regularly appeared in-vision as a Scottish News/Reporting Scotland bulletin presenter.

He retired from announcing in 2000. Bob was a Christian and worshipped at st Georges Tron

References

Living people
Radio and television announcers
Year of birth missing (living people)